Henry Nixon is an Australian actor.

Nixon was born at St Margaret's Hospital in the inner-Sydney suburb of Surry Hills. As a child he lived in Elanora Heights, Paddington and Wollstonecraft in Sydney with his father, Gerald Nixon, a Recording Engineer and his mother, Vanessa, a Nurse. After their divorce Nixon relocated (with his mother and step father) from Sydney to the Burra Valley, near Canberra. He was educated in Canberra at AME School, Red Hill Primary, Canberra Grammar School and then Narrabundah College, where he studied drama.

He graduated from the Australian National University with an Arts degree, majoring in anthropology, Sociology and English, and was going to continue in the world of Academia but opted instead to pursue an Acting career. He auditioned for three Drama Schools: WAAPA, VCA and NIDA  and was accepted into all three but decided to attend the National Institute of Dramatic Art (NIDA) in Sydney.

Since graduating from NIDA in 2000 Nixon has worked extensively in film, television and theatre.

In 2002 he played the character Chris King in the popular Channel 5 TV serial Don't Blame Me (or Don't Blame the Koalas). He is known for his work as Sterlo McCormack on All Saints, an Australian hospital drama. His film work includes Matthew Saville's NOISE (2007), Cate Shortland's Somersault (2004), Triangle (2009) and Julia Leigh's Sleeping Beauty (2011).

Nixon was flown from Sydney to Los Angeles in 2007 to audition personally for Tom Hanks and Steven Spielberg for the role of Leckie in the HBO/Playtone/DreamWorks Co production of The Pacific. The role eventually went to James Badge Dale and Nixon ended up portraying 2nd LT Hugh Corrigan.

Nixon played the role of Snr Constable Fergus Mcfadden in the mini-series The Kettering Incident in 2016 for which he received the coveted Silver Logie for Most Outstanding Actor at the 2017 Logie Awards.

In addition to his work in front of the camera Nixon is also a respected voice over artist, having lent his voice to many major campaigns including Mitsubishi, McDonald's, Nissan, IGA, and NIB.

Nixon divides his time between Sydney, Australia and Los Angeles, California. He is a keen skipper and outdoor enthusiast.

Filmography 

 The Lost World (2002) (or Sir Arthur Conan Doyle's The Lost World) (Episode: "Tapestry"), as Bartholomew Thorne
 Home and Away (2002) (Season 1, Episode 3270), as Steve McLaren
 Don't Blame Me (or Don't Blame the Koalas) (2002) as Chris King
 Somersault (2004), as Nick
 All Saints (2003–2004), as Sterling (Sterlo) McCormack (52 episodes) Season 6 - Season 7
 Safety in Numbers (2005), as Nigel
 McLeod's Daughters (2001–2006), as Greg Dawson (6 episodes)
 Happy Feet (2006) (as live action cast)
 Feeling Lonely? (2007), as Drew
 Noise (2007), as Craig Finlay
 The Black Balloon (2008), as Trevor
 $9.99 (2008), as Drazen/beanbag/radio announcer (as voice only)
 Nightwalking (2009), as Dad
 Triangle (2009), as Downey
 Squid: The Movie (2010), as Alan or Uncle Fester
 The Pacific (2010), as Lt. Hugh (Ivy League) Corrigan
 Cold Sore (2010), as Guy
 Scumbus (2011), as Adam
 Sleeping Beauty (2011), as Mark
 Little Monsters (2019), as Security Guard Bob

References

External links
 

1970s births
Australian male television actors
Australian National University alumni
Living people
Logie Award winners
Male actors from Sydney
National Institute of Dramatic Art alumni